Jeremy Walker may refer to:

Jeremy Walker (baseball) (born 1995), American baseball player
Jeremy Walker (soccer) (born 1993), Australian footballer
Jeremy Kipp Walker, American filmmaker

See also
Jeremy Kemp (1935–2019), English actor with the surname "Walker"